Austin Kanallakan (born May 23, 1991) is an American former competitive figure skater. He won three gold medals on the ISU Junior Grand Prix series and silver at the 2006 JGP Final.

In his first year on the JGP circuit, Kanallakan qualified for the Junior Grand Prix Final, where he placed second. He qualified twice more for the event but did not make the podium again. At the 2007 U.S. Championships, he overcame a poor result in the short program to win the free skate and claim the bronze medal on the junior level.

Programs

Competitive highlights
JGP: Junior Grand Prix

References

External links

 
 Official site

American male single skaters
Figure skaters from Los Angeles
1991 births
Living people
People from Woodland Hills, Los Angeles